A Thousand Days' Promise is a 2011 South Korean traditional melodrama about a woman (Soo Ae) who is losing her memory and the loving man (Kim Rae-won) who stands by her side. Written by famed drama writer Kim Soo-hyun, it aired on SBS from October 17 to December 20, 2011 on Mondays and Tuesdays at 21:55 for 20 episodes.

Synopsis
Lee Seo-yeon, a free-spirited woman, is having a secret affair with Park Ji-hyung, an architect who has a fiancée. Upon hearing that Ji-hyung's parents set the date for his wedding, Seo-yeon splits up with him. But she has no time to lament over her painful breakup, as she gets diagnosed with early on-set Alzheimer's, a very unlikely disease for a 30-year-old woman. Ji-hyung happens to learn the shocking fact, and he breaks off his engagement only two days before the wedding to return to his ex-girlfriend. Despite vehement opposition from his parents and even from Seo-yeon herself, he never gives up on her and marries her without delay. The doting husband is devoted to taking care of his ailing wife, who is losing her ability to remember. Despite her distressing condition, the couple tries to hang on to love and experience it to the end. They have a baby girl and find happiness in their married life from time to time, even though both are well aware that a tragic end awaits them.

Cast
Soo Ae as Lee Seo-yeon
Han Bo-bae as young Seo-yeon
Kim Rae-won as Park Ji-hyung
Lee Sang-woo as Jang Jae-min, Seo-yeon's cousin
Jeong Yu-mi as Noh Hyang-gi
Park Yu-hwan as Lee Moon-kwon, Seo-yeon's brother
Oh Mi-yeon as Seo-yeon's aunt 
Kim Hae-sook as Kang Soo-jung, Ji-hyung's mother
Lee Mi-sook as Oh Hyun-ah, Hyang-gi's mother
Moon Jeong-hee as Jang Myung-hee, Seo-yeon's cousin
Yoo Hye-ri as Guem-yoon
Im Chae-moo as Park Chang-joo, Ji-hyung's father 
Park Yeong-gyu as Noh Hong-gil, Hyang-gi's father 
Yoo Seung-bong as Seo-yeon's uncle-in-law
Jung Joon as Cha Dong-chul, Myung-hee's husband 
Yang Han-yeol as Myung-hee's son
Kim Boo-seon as Seo-yeon's biological mother
Jang Hyun-sung as Seo-yeon's doctor
Kang Rae-yeon as Myung-hee
Song Chang-eui as Noh Young-soo, Hyang-gi's brother 
Alex Chu as Son Suk-ho, Ji-hyung's friend
Oh Kyung-soo as Seo-yeon's editor-in-chief

Soundtrack
Information
Title: 천일의 약속 OST / A Thousand Days' Promise
Artist: Various Artists
Language: Korean
Release Date: 2011-Nov-29
Number of Tracks: 15
Publisher: KT Music (KT뮤직)
Agency: Yeinmoonhwa (예인문화)

Track Listing

Ratings

Source: TNmS Media Korea

Awards and nominations

See also
A Moment to Remember, a 2004 South Korean film in which the female protagonist has early-onset Alzheimer's.

References

External links
A Thousand Days' Promise official SBS website 

2011 South Korean television series debuts
2011 South Korean television series endings
Seoul Broadcasting System television dramas
Korean-language television shows
Television shows written by Kim Soo-hyun (writer)
South Korean romance television series
South Korean melodrama television series